"Love Anyway" is a song from Scottish singer-songwriter Mike Scott, which was released as the lead single from his second solo album Still Burning. It was written by Mike Scott, and produced by Scott and Niko Bolas. "Love Anyway" reached No. 50 in the UK Singles Chart and remained on the charts for two weeks.

Background
In his autobiography, Scott described the song as a "mid-paced rocker with a hustly Jim Keltner groove and a hazy, chiming guitar figure." It was considered by Chrysalis as the album's best contender for a potential hit. Speaking of its limited success as a single, he said: "Despite all its radio play the song [did not catch] on with the public."

Music video
The song's music video was directed by Matthew Amos and produced by Anna Whiting.

Critical reception
On its release, Wayne Moriarty of the Edmonton Journal considered the song the "best cut" on Still Burning. He described the track as "a big old slab of Waterboys-ish pomp and rock that will remind his devotees just how special it was when Mike and the lads were pioneering the big sound that carried the likes of U2 to fame and fortune." Kerry Gold of the Vancouver Sun noted the song's "multiple violins and lush orchestration".

In a review of Scott's 1997 concert at the Garage in London, James McNair of The Independent was critical of the song's live rendition: "It's not that "Love Anyway" is weak - far from it. The problem is that the soaring strings that are integral to the song's magic on CD are missing live and, at six minutes 42 seconds, the journey is just too long without them."

In his 2002 book The Encyclopedia of Contemporary Christian Music, Mark Allan Powell noted "the manner in which songs like "Love Anyway" bespeak an ethic unlike that which informs previous Waterboys' tunes about heartbreak and disappointment in love. Whereas previous songs express bitterness and even a design for vengeance, "Love Anyway" boasts "You made a fool our of me today / I'm breaking the rule / I love you anyway"." In 2011, Richard Curtis, in a piece for The Guardian on his affection for Scott and the Waterboys, commented: "If you're ever feeling low on energy and hope, pump up "This Is the Sea", "Don't Bang the Drum" or "Love Anyway" and life seems worth living again – worth living large."

Formats

Personnel

Love Anyway
 Mike Scott - lead vocals, rhythm guitar, Canyon guitar, piano, string and melody arrangement
 Chris Bruce - lead guitar
 James Hallawell - Hammond organ
 Pino Palladino - bass
 Jim Keltner - drums, tambourine
 Nick Ingman - orchestration
 Martin Loveday, Paul Kegg - cello
 Isobel Griffiths - fixer strings
 Bill Hawkes, Peter Lale - viola
 Boguslav Kostecki, Perry Montague-Mason, Wilfred Gibson - violins
 Gavyn Wright - first violin

King Electric
 Mike Scott - lead vocals, rhythm guitar, Hammond organ
 Chris Bruce - lead guitar
 Brian Stanley - bass
 Steve Holley - drums

Blues Is My Business
 Mike Scott - lead vocals, rhythm guitar
 Chris Bruce - lead guitar
 Brian Stanley - bass
 Steve Holley - drums

Big Lover
 Mike Scott - vocals, electric guitar, electric piano
 Chris Bruce - lead guitar
 Bob Andrews - Hammond organ

 Pino Palladino - bass
 Jim Keltner - drums
 Preston Heyman - percussion

Careful with That Melletron, Eugene
 Mike Scott - vocals, Bouzouki
 Jan Kybert - Mellotron
 Preston Heyman - percussion

Since I Found My School
 Mike Scott - vocals, electric guitar, piano, Mellotron
 Chris Bruce - electric guitar
 Ian McNabb - guitar, Falsetto vocals
 Pino Palladino - bass
 Jim Keltner - drums

Production
 Mike Scott - producer
 Niko Bolas - producer, recording, engineer, mixing
 Chris Blair - mastering
 Chris Sheldon - mixing on "Love Anyway"

Other
 Jeremy Pearce at 2wo - design
 Andrew Catlin - photography

Charts

References

1997 songs
1997 singles
Chrysalis Records singles
Songs written by Mike Scott (musician)
Song recordings produced by Mike Scott (musician)
Song recordings produced by Niko Bolas